Delinquent Habits is the first studio album by the American hip hop group Delinquent Habits. It was released on June 4, 1996, by RCA, on the RCA/Loud subsidiary, PMP Records. Audio production of the album was by Alejandro "O.G. Style" Martinez, except for one track produced by Eric Bobo. It has guest appearances provided by Sen Dog and Hurricane G on the track "Underground Connection". The album peaked at number 74 on the US Billboard 200 and at number 31 on the Top R&B/Hip-Hop Albums chart. Two singles were released, "Tres Delinquentes" and "Lower Eastside".

Singles 
"Tres Delinquentes" was released as the album's lead single on April 7, 1996. It contains a sample of "The Lonely Bull", which was originally written by Sol Lake and performed by Herb Alpert in 1962 on his The Lonely Bull. The single reached #35 on the US Billboard Hot 100, becoming the first Delinquent Habits' song in the charts. It also peaked at #61 on the Hot R&B/Hip-Hop Songs, #10 on the Hot Rap Songs, #22 on the Rhythmic Songs and #71 on the Radio Songs charts. Sen Dog of Cypress Hill made a cameo appearance in the music video for "Tres Delinquentes".

The second single from the album, "Lower Eastside", was released on September 9, 1996. It peaked at #36 on the Hot Rap Songs chart, and also has a music video.

Track listing

Sample credits
"Tres Delinquentes"
"The Lonely Bull" by Herb Alpert
"3 Lil' Putos" by Cypress Hill
"Lower Eastside"
"The Champ" by The Mohawks
"Flor De Azalea" by Juan Torres
"Juvy"
"Voices Inside (Everything Is Everything)" by Donny Hathaway
"What It Be Like"
"It's Your Thing" by Cold Grits
"S.A.L.T. (Shit Ain't Like That)"
"Four Play" by Fred Wesley and The Horny Horns
"I'm Addicted"
"Is It Him or Me?" by Jackie Jackson
"Hot Pants" by James Brown
"Good Times"
"Lonely Soul" by Freddie Hubbard
"Lay Lady Lay" by The Byrds
"Break 'Em Off"
"Sweeping Through the City" by The Stovall Sisters
"Another Fix"
"This Is Soul" by Paul Nero
"Best of My Love" by The Emotions

Personnel

David L.K. Thomas – vocals
Ivan S. Martin – vocals
Alejandro R. Martinez – additional vocals, producer (tracks: 1-5, 7-14)
Senen Reyes – executive producer, additional vocals (track 13)
Gloria Rodriguez – additional vocals (track 13)
Eric "Bobo" Correa – producer (track 6)
Dorian "Doe" Johnson – keyboards (track 4)
Paul J. Thompson – trumpet (track 13)
Paul Stewart – executive producer
Brian Knapp Gardner – mastering
Gary Meals – A&R direction
Grant Lau – art direction and design
Thellus Singleton – cover artwork
Mike Miller – photography
Kimberly Felty – management

Chart history

References

External links

1996 debut albums
Delinquent Habits albums
RCA Records albums